Ertzia is a monospecific genus in the family Lepidostromataceae (the only family within the fungal order Lepidostromatales). The sole species is Ertzia akagerae. The genus was circumscribed in 2014 by Brendan Hodkinson and Robert Lücking. Ertzia is distinguished from all other lichenized clavarioid fungi (Multiclavula (Cantharellales), Lepidostroma (Lepidostromatales), and Sulzbacheromyces (Lepidostromatales)) by having a microsquamulose thallus that forms contiguous glomerules (reminiscent of a 'Botrydina-type' thallus) with a cortex of jigsaw puzzle-shaped cells. Ertzia akagerae grows on soil in the African tropics.

References

Agaricomycetes
Basidiolichens
Lichen genera
Monotypic Basidiomycota genera
Taxa described in 2014
Taxa named by Robert Lücking